James Webb (born June 20, 1975 in Kimberley, Northern Cape) is a South African artist best known for his interventions and installations incorporating sound.  Webb also works as a sound designer, curator and teacher.  His sound installations place special emphasis on the sourcing and presentation of the sound clips, as well as the social significance and context of these sounds.  Often referred to as a "collector of sounds," Webb is interested in the role that aural events play in our everyday life. The physical presentation of the work, including the installation space and the logistics of speakers, are also deliberate choices for Webb.

Webb received the 2008 ABSA L'Atelier Award and his work is featured in many private and public collections, including the Iziko South African National Gallery, the Johannesburg Art Gallery, and the Nelson Mandela Metropolitan Art Museum.

Career

Education
Webb received his BA in Drama and Comparative Religion at the University of Cape Town in 1996.

Exhibitions
2011
 Fierce Festival, The Old Library, Birmingham, United Kingdom

2010
 Aleph, Goethe on Main, Johannesburg, South Africa
 Terms of Surrender, ABSA Gallery, Johannesburg, South Africa
 United States, MAC, Birmingham, United Kingdom
 Prayer, Djanogly Gallery, Nottingham, United Kingdom
 Jwakznsa, KZNSA, Durban, South Africa
 One Day, All of This Will Be Yours, Blank Projects, Cape Town, South Africa
 Sentences On The Banks and other activities, Darat Al-Funun, Amman, Jordan
 Reflex / Reflexión, Johannesburg Art Gallery, South Africa
 Article Biennale, various venues, Stavanger, Norway
 My World Images, various venues, Copenhagen, Denmark
 Istanbul, Athens, Marrakech, Palermo, Catania, RISO Museo d’Arte Contemporanea della Sicilia, Palermo
 In Other Words, Goodman Gallery, Johannesburg, South Africa
 Twenty, Nirox Foundation, Johannesburg, South Africa
 Contemporary Artists From South Africa, Stiftelsen 314, Bergen, Norway
 Ampersand, Daimler Contemporary, Berlin, Germany
 No Soul For Sale, L'appartement 22 / Tate Modern, London, United Kingdom
 1910 – 2010, Iziko South African National Gallery, Cape Town, South Africa
 Printemps des Poétes, Salon de lecture, Musée du quai Branly, Paris

2009
 Happy House, Kunst im Tunnel, Düsseldorf, Germany
 3rd Arts In Marrakech Biennale, Marrakech Museum, Morocco
 L’effacement des traces, Musée d'histoire contemporaine, Paris, France
 Melbourne International Arts Festival, Melbourne, Australia
 CAPE 09, Cape Town’s second biennale of contemporary African Culture, various venues, Cape Town, South Africa 
 This Is Now 2, L’appartement 22, Rabat, Morocco

2008
 Prayer, Huddersfield Art Gallery, UK
 Jozi & The (M)Other City, Michaelis Gallery, Cape Town, South Africa
 Home Bound, Stiftung Kunst:Raum Sylt Quelle, Sylt, Germany
 za. Giovane arte dal Sud Africa, Palazzo delle Papesse Centro Arte Contemporanea, Siena, Italy
 This Is Now 1, Joburg Art Fair, South Africa
 Light Show, Bank Gallery, Durban, South Africa

2007
 Beau Diable, Gallery In The Round, Grahamstown, South Africa
 Sakra!, St. Andrä, Graz, Austria
 9th Biennale d'Art Contemporain de Lyon, Lyon, France 
 3C, Critic’s Choice Exhibition, Association for Visual Arts, Cape Town
 (In)visible Sounds, Netherlands Media Art Institute, Amsterdam (With Brandon LaBelle)
 Afterlife, Michael Stevenson Contemporary, Cape Town

2006
 Untitled, Blank Projects, Cape Town, South Africa

2002
 Phonosynthesizer, US Art Gallery, Stellenbosch, South Africa

References

External links
Artist website
Sylt interview

1975 births
South African artists
People from Kimberley, Northern Cape
Living people